The discography of Franciscus Henri, a Dutch-Australian folk, gospel and children's music performer, consists of 23 studio albums, 1 compilation album, 5 singles and 7 home video releases.

Studio albums

Compilations

Singles

Home Video

VHS

DVD

References

External links
 
 Franciscus Henri at Rate Your Music

Discographies of Australian artists
Folk music discographies